The Selçukgazi Tunnel is a motorway tunnel located at Dürdane Hill in Marmara Region as part of the Istanbul-Bursa Motorway  in Turkey.

The construction is carried out by Otoyol A.Ş., a consortium of Turkish Nurol, Özaltın, Makyol, Yüksel, Göçay and Italian Astaldi companies. Works at the tunnel began in July 2013, and are continuing. In March 2014, it was announced that the preparatory works are completed and tunneling will start soon.

The tunnel was opened to traffic on March 12, 2017 by Turkish Prime Minister Binali Yıldırım.

Other tunnels on the route are the -long Orhangazi Tunnel and the -long Belkahve Tunnel.

See also
List of motorway tunnels in Turkey

References

Road tunnels in Turkey
Transport in Bursa Province